William Stone Cowsert (born September 1, 1958) is an American politician from the state of Georgia. A member of the Republican Party, Cowsert serves in the Georgia State Senate, representing the 46th district.

Early life and education
Cowsert was born  September 1, 1958,  in  Jackson, Mississippi. He was raised  in  Macon, Georgia, and graduated  from  Macon  Central  High School. Cowsert subsequently earned a B.S. degree in business administration from Presbyterian College, and a J.D. degree from the University of Georgia School of Law. After passing the bar, Cowsert founded the  Athens law firm  of Cowsert & Avery.

Political career
Cowsert was elected to the Georgia State Senate in 2006, and took office in 2007 representing the 46th District. His Senate peers elected him Majority Leader in 2014. Cowsert's senatorial district extends into Clarke, Oconee, and Walton counties. He serves on the Senate Appropriations, Finance, Health and Human Services, Judiciary, Reapportionment and Redistricting, Regulated Industries and Utilities, and Rules committees.

Controversy
Cowsert, as Vice Chair of the Senate Judiciary Committee, became embroiled in a controversial issue during the 2018 legislative session, when The Hidden Predator Act of 2018 (HB 605) was referred to his committee. The intention of HB 605 was to reopen statutes of limitations for victims of child sex abuse, and to allow civil lawsuits to be brought against both the predator and the entities who were allegedly negligent or grossly negligent in their duty of care (i.e., concealment of known predatory behavior by a person). The legislation had previously passed the House with a 170-0 vote. Cowsert, along with other Republican committee members met to draft an amended version of the bill. When the proposed legislation came before his committee, Cowsert supported the Senate version of the bill. The Senate passed the substitute version of HB 605 by a vote of 51-0, and it was sent back to the House. The bill's sponsor, Jason Spencer, asked the House to insist on the language of the original bill. This insistence came on the final day of the 2018 legislative session and past the deadline for the Senate to hold a vote on reconsideration. The Senate held a vote to waive the Senate rules on reconsideration, but the vote lost in the final hours of the session, effectively killing the bill for 2018.

Cowsert's law partner, M. Steven Heath, is currently defending a small church in a current Georgia case of child sex abuse concealment. Cowsert has said he has no personal involvement in the case. His firm does not now, nor has it ever, represented the Boy Scouts of America, although some have incorrectly gleaned that from a vague reference in the Atlanta Journal-Constitution.

Personal life
Cowsert and his wife, Amy, are the parents of three children:  Will,  Bob,  and  Caty.  They are members of the  First Presbyterian Church of Athens, where he is an elder. 
 His wife is the daughter of insurance executive and state representative Bob Argo and the sister-in-law of businessman and the current Governor of Georgia Brian Kemp.

References

1958 births
21st-century American politicians
Republican Party Georgia (U.S. state) state senators
Living people
Politicians from Athens, Georgia
Presbyterian College alumni
University of Georgia School of Law alumni